Lampang Province Stadium or Nong Kra Ting Stadium (known as Nong Krating Stadium) is a multi-purpose stadium in Lampang Province, Thailand. It is currently used mostly for football matches and is the home stadium of Lampang Football Club. The stadium holds 5,500 people and is home to the Lampang Football Club.

References

Multi-purpose stadiums in Thailand
Buildings and structures in Lampang province